Jaroslav Rošický (19 September 1884, Třešť – 25 June 1942, Prague) was a Czech army officer.

As a soldier he participated in World War I, fighting in the Austrian army in Russia and Italy. He was injured in 1917 and returned to Brno, later moving to Prague. There he met members of the Czech National Committee, the leading body of the Czech and Czechoslovak independence movements. Rošický and Sokol leader Josef Scheiner were in charge of their respective military operations.

During World War II, Rošický was a member of the captain Nemo anti-Nazi resistance group. In 1942 he was arrested and executed along with his son, communist journalist and athlete Evžen Rošický.

His brother-in-law was Czech politician Zdeněk Fierlinger.

References 

1942 deaths
1884 births
People from Třešť
People from the Margraviate of Moravia
Czech military personnel
Resistance members killed by Nazi Germany
People executed at Kobylisy shooting range
Austro-Hungarian military personnel of World War I
Czechoslovak civilians killed in World War II